Samuel Heidelberg Terral (February 4, 1835 – March 20, 1903) was a justice of the Mississippi Supreme Court from 1897 until his death in 1903.

Early life and education
Born in Jasper County, Mississippi, Terral was educated in the county schools and graduated from the University of Mississippi and its law school. While there, he was a member of the Fraternity of Delta Psi (aka St. Anthony Hall).

Career
On January 9, 1861, Terral attended the Mississippi Secession Convention, representing Clarke County where Mississippi would pass an Ordinance of Secession from the U.S.

Terral fought for the Confederates against the U.S. during the American Civil War, enlisting in Company C of the 37th Mississippi Regiment and served as its captain until 1863, when he was promoted to the rank of major. After the war he settled permanently at Quitman, Mississippi where he engaged in the practice of law, including working as a district attorney.

In 1882, after the end of Reconstruction, Terral became a member of the Mississippi House of Representatives. He then served as a circuit court judge until his 1897 elevation to the Supreme Court, by appointment of Governor Anselm J. McLaurin.

Personal life 
He died at Quitman on March 21, 1903.

References

1835 births
1903 deaths
Justices of the Mississippi Supreme Court
University of Mississippi alumni
University of Mississippi School of Law alumni
Members of the Mississippi House of Representatives
People from Jasper County, Mississippi
People from Quitman, Mississippi
19th-century American politicians
19th-century American judges
St. Anthony Hall